This article refers to the former minor league baseball team. For the major league baseball teams see Syracuse Stars (American Association) and Syracuse Stars (National League).

The Syracuse Stars was the name of several Minor league baseball teams who played between 1877 and 1929. The Stars were based in Syracuse, New York, and played in the International League, affiliated with the League Alliance; the New York State League (1885, 1902–1917), Eastern Association (1891), Eastern League (1892, 1894–1901), International League (1886–1887), International Association (1888–1889), and New York-Pennsylvania League (1928–1929).

Season-by-season standings

See also 
 1876 in baseball
 Moses Fleetwood Walker

References 

 The Encyclopedia of Minor League Baseball – Lloyd Johnson, Miles Wolff. Publisher: Baseball America, 1997. Format: Hardcover, 672 pp. Language: English.

External links 
 Gersbacher, Ron. (2012). "History of Syracuse Baseball, 1858 to Present"

Defunct baseball teams in New York (state)
Baseball teams established in 1877
1877 establishments in New York (state)
Minor league
New York State League teams
Baseball teams disestablished in 1929